Monte Carlo Madness is a 1932 German musical comedy film directed by Hanns Schwarz and starring Sari Maritza, Hans Albers and Charles Redgie. It was an English-language version of the 1931 German film Bombs on Monte Carlo, which was based on the 1930 novel Bombs on Monte Carlo by Fritz Reck-Malleczewen. The screenplay concerns a captain who falls in love with a Queen in Monte Carlo. It cost  to produce.

The film's sets were designed by the art director Erich Kettelhut.

Plot
In Monte Carlo, a captain tries to raise the money to pay his crew at the gaming table, and meets and falls in love with a Queen.

Cast
Sari Maritza as Queen Yola
Hans Albers as Capt. Erickson
Charles Redgie as Peter
Helen Haye as Isabel
John Deverell as Consul
C. Hooper Trask as Prime Minister
Comedian Harmonists as Themselves
Kapelle Carlo Minari as Themselves - Orchestra

Reception
The film was not a success with contemporary critics. A review in Film Pictorial observed that "Erich Pommer is a great producer, but in this film he does not live up to his established reputation.

References

External links

Films of the Weimar Republic
1932 musical comedy films
Films directed by Hanns Schwarz
Operetta films
German multilingual films
Seafaring films
Films set in Monaco
Films set in the Mediterranean Sea
Films based on German novels
German black-and-white films
Films with screenplays by Franz Schulz
German musical comedy films
1932 multilingual films
1930s German films